Fanny Babou (born 26 March 1989) is a French swimmer. She competed for France at the 2012 Summer Olympics in the 100 metres breaststroke and the 4x100 metres medley relay.

During the London 2012 Olympics Babou, became a gag on the Chris Moyles Breakfast show, even with her own jingle.

References

Swimmers at the 2012 Summer Olympics
Olympic swimmers of France
1989 births
Living people
French female breaststroke swimmers
21st-century French women